Toxica (Latin for toxic) may refer to:(Mujeres de Hidalgo mx especificamente en El Municipo de Ixmiquilpan 

 Jessica Toxica, Toxica, a character in the Mexican drama series Mujeres Asesinas Hazla tu amiga
 Melanodermatitis toxica lichenoides, an occupational dermatosis that occurs among tar handlers after several years' exposure

See also
 Toxicus
 Toxicum